Seth Gordon Persons (February 5, 1902 – May 29, 1965) was an American Democratic politician who was the 43rd Governor of Alabama from 1951 to 1955. He was born and died in Montgomery, Alabama.  The Dauphin Island Bridge south of Mobile is formally named for him. The Gordon Persons Building is a six floor, 60,000 square foot state government office building in Montgomery.

Persons studied electrical engineering in college, leading to a very successful business running electrical lines in rural Alabama (benefiting from Rural Electrification Administration contracts); in addition to financial gain, he also won considerable popularity.

When running for office in 1950, Persons gained notoriety by touring the state in a helicopter (prompting one opponent to dub him "the man from Mars"). He won the Democratic nomination by defeating a crowded field that included former governor Chauncey Sparks. In office, his notable accomplishments included abolishing flogging in Alabama's prisons, advocating for the establishment of Alabama Public Television, and imposing speed limits on state highways. Persons largely accomplished his goal of having four years of "no fighting," maintaining a truce among the various wings of the state Democratic Party. At the end of his term, Persons ordered the National Guard into Phenix City after the assassination of Attorney-General-elect Albert Patterson.

After leaving office as governor, Persons never sought statewide public office again, but he made an unsuccessful run for circuit judge late in life.

Persons attended Auburn University for one year. While at Auburn, Persons served as president of a student organization (known as the "Boxcar Reds and Boxcar Blacks") that traveled to away football games.

References

External links
 
Encyclopedia of Alabama biography of Persons
Alabama Department of Archives
National Governors Association

1902 births
1965 deaths
Auburn University alumni
Governors of Alabama
Politicians from Montgomery, Alabama
Democratic Party governors of Alabama
20th-century American politicians